Savov is a Bulgarian masculine surname, its feminine counterpart is Savova. It may refer to
Ekaterina Savova-Nenova (1901–1980), Bulgarian painter
Galina Savova (born 1945), Bulgarian operatic soprano
Kondiu Savov, Bulgarian pop-folk singer
Mihail Savov (1857–1928), Bulgarian general
Pavel Savov (born 1971), Bulgarian wheelchair curler
Stefka Savova (born 1958), Bulgarian chess master
Žanko Savov (born 1965), Macedonian football coach and former player

Bulgarian-language surnames